Wireless HDMI is a colloquial term for wireless high-definition audio and video signals connectivity on consumer electronics products.

Currently, most HD wireless transmission technologies use unlicensed 5 GHz, 60 GHz or 190 GHz radio frequencies and include:

 various proprietary protocols for wireless transmission (LG "Wireless 1080p", Philips "Wireless HDTV Link", Sony "Bravia Wireless Link", Asus "Wireless Display Connectivity", etc.);
 there are several technologies attempting to become the industry standards like WirelessHD, Wireless Home Digital Interface and the WiGig;
 proprietary video compression schemes that work over 802.11n and similar wireless interfaces;
 Asus WAVI (Wireless Audio Video Interaction) wireless HDMI use  4 x 5 MIMO-channels with Two-Way Wireless USB Control.

Wireless HDTV (aka WiDi) availability is currently an ongoing development. In 2010, Toshiba began marketing the first WiDi device.

See also
 WirelessHD
 Wireless Home Digital Interface
 WiGig
 WiDi version 3.5 to 6.0 supports Miracast;  discontinued
 Miracast (wireless display technology), now a subset of the larger Wi-Fi Direct certification

IP based
 Chromecast (proprietary media broadcast over ip: Google Cast for audio or audiovisual playback)
 AirPlay (proprietary ip based)
 Digital Living Network Alliance (DLNA) (ip based)

Cables for mobile equipment
 Mobile High-Definition Link - MHL
 SlimPort (Mobility DisplayPort), also known as MyDP

References

External links
The Main Wireless HDMI Transmission Protocols and Their Typical Products

Wireless networking
Television technology
Film and video technology